The Oslo Symposium is a biennial Norwegian Christian conservative conference, first arranged in 2011. The initiative to the conference was taken by Bjarte Ystebo and the organisation Kristenfolket in cooperation with ICEJ and Norge Idag, and it has been broadcast live by Visjon Norge. The conference includes speeches by leading Norwegian and international commentators and politicians, including party leaders and government ministers.

The third conference, in 2015 for the first time had to be arranged with "massive" police security, due to a general threat evaluation by the Norwegian Police Security Service, pointing to the Paris and Copenhagen terrorist attacks the two preceding months.

References

External links
 Official website

2011 establishments in Norway
Christianity in Norway
Conservatism in Norway
Political conferences
Christian conferences